Pierre Dansereau  (October 5, 1911 – September 28, 2011) was a Canadian ecologist from Quebec known as one of the "fathers of ecology".

Biography
Born in Outremont, Quebec (now part of Montreal), he received a Bachelor of Science in Agriculture (B.Sc.A.) in 1936 and a Ph.D. in Biological Science in 1939 from the University of Geneva. From 1939 until 1942 he worked at the Montreal Botanical Garden. From 1943 until 1950 he taught at the Université de Montréal. From 1950 until 1955 he worked at the University of Michigan Botanical Gardens. From 1955 until 1961 he worked in the Faculty of Science and as the director of the Botanical Institute at the Université de Montréal. In 1961 he returned to the United States as the assistant director of the New York Botanical Garden and as a professor of botany and geography at the Columbia University. From 1972 until 1976 he was the Director of the Research Centre for Sciences and the Environment at the Université du Québec à Montréal (UQAM). In 1988 he was made a Professor Emeritus at UQAM, but he still worked there after mandatory retirement (in 1976, at 65 years old) to year 2004, aged 93.

He was the subject of a 2001 documentary An Ecology of Hope by his cousin, Quebec filmmaker Fernand Dansereau.

On September 28, 2011, Pierre Dansereau died, one week before his 100th birthday, after 76 years of marriage, and three months after his wife (a painter) became a centenarian — they had no children.

UQAM's Complexe des sciences Pierre-Dansereau was named for him.

Honours
In 1987 the Canadian Botanical Association awarded him the George Lawson Medal.
 1949 - Made a Fellow of the Royal Society of Canada (MSRC)
 1959 - Awarded an Honorary Doctor of Laws from the University of Saskatchewan
 1965 - Awarded the Léo-Pariseau Prize
 1969 - Made a Companion of the Order of Canada
 1971 - Awarded honorary doctorate from Sir George Williams University, which later became Concordia University.
 1972 - Delivered the Massey Lecture
 1973 - Awarded the Royal Canadian Geographical Society's Massey Medal
 1974 - Won the Molson Prize
 1983 - Awarded the Université de Sherbrooke's prix Esdras-Minville
 1983 - Won the Government of Quebec's Prix Marie-Victorin
 1985 - Made a Knight of the National Order of Quebec; promoted to Grand Officer in 1992
 1985 - Awarded the Canada Council for the Arts' Killam Prize
 1986 - Awarded the Canadian Botanical Association's George Lawson Medal
 1995 - Awarded the Royal Society of Canada's Sir John William Dawson Medal
 2001 - Inducted into the Canadian Science and Engineering Hall of Fame

References

External links

 Pierre Dansereau at The Canadian Encyclopedia
 Audio interview with Pierre Dansereau on Les années lumière
 'Barefoot ecologist' got up close to nature Toronto Globe and Mail obituary

1911 births
2011 deaths
Canadian ecologists
Canadian expatriate academics in the United States
University of Geneva alumni
Grand Officers of the National Order of Quebec
Companions of the Order of Canada
French Quebecers
Fellows of the Royal Society of Canada
People from Outremont, Quebec
Columbia University faculty
University of Michigan staff
Academic staff of the Université du Québec à Montréal
Massey Medal recipients
Fellows of the Ecological Society of America